Neusiedl am See is a town in Burgenland, Austria, and administrative center of the district of Neusiedl am See.

Neusiedl am See is located on the northern shore of the Neusiedler See.

History 
The first mention of "Sumbotheil" (referring to its right to hold Saturday markets) dates back to 1209. In the mid-13th century, the town was destroyed by the Mongols, and by 1282 under the name "Niusidel" resettled. In 1517 Neusiedl received market rights. Neusiedl in 1683 was in the wake of the second Turkish siege, and in 1708 the town was devastated by the Kuruc. Neusiedl am See received a city charter in 1926, which had already been investigated in 1824.

Like the rest of Burgenland, it was part of the Kingdom of Hungary until 1920/21. After the end of World War I it was given to Austria in the Treaty of St. Germain and Trianon. It has belonged since 1921 to the new State of Burgenland (see also history of Burgenland). 

The town is known as the birthplace of the experimental guitarist and composer, Christian Fennesz, known for his swirling, spatial works and collaboration with Japanese pianist Ryuichi Sakamoto.

Climate

Population

Gallery

See also 
 Ostautobahn
 Moson County
 List of concentration and internment camps
 Flying Dutchman (dinghy)

References

External links 

 Official website (German) with 3 lifecams, one of them an inhabited stork's nest (checked 2008-06-01)
 Aerial photograph, view towards N
 similar, higher resolution (app. 2.5 MB)

Cities and towns in Neusiedl am See District